Otis Samuel Lambeth (May 13, 1890 – June 5, 1976) was a Major League Baseball pitcher who played for three seasons. He played for the Cleveland Indians from 1916 to 1918, pitching in 43 career games.

External links

1890 births
1976 deaths
Cleveland Indians players
Major League Baseball pitchers
Baseball players from Kansas
People from Bourbon County, Kansas
Emporia Bidwells players
Topeka Savages players
Columbus Senators players
Akron Buckeyes players